Samoa Air was a scheduled and charter passenger airline based in Pago Pago, American Samoa.

History
An airline named Samoa Air started operations in 1985, with flights from Pago Pago to Honolulu using a leased Boeing 707. 

Samoa Air started operations on January 18, 1987, with a single de Havilland Canada DHC-6 Twin Otter aircraft. In 1990 both the airline's Twin Otters were damaged in Niue by Cyclone Ofa. In 1996 it was operating Twin Otters between Pago Pago and the Manuʻa Islands, and a Beechcraft King Air to Vavaʻu in Tonga, as well as flights to Apia in Samoa. In January 1997 it celebrated its 10th anniversary.

In June 2002 the company announced plans to expand into a regional airline covering all of Polynesia. In July 2003 it attempted to raise capital for a jet service to Honolulu. In September 2003 it ceased all operations after failing to lease another aircraft to replace its sole Twin Otter, which was scheduled for maintenance. After failing to secure further investors, it sought bankruptcy protection in December 2003.

See also 
 List of defunct airlines of the United States

References

External links
Samoa Air Boeing 707 Image at Planepictures.net

Defunct airlines of American Samoa
Airlines established in 1987
Airlines disestablished in 2003
1987 establishments in Oceania
2003 disestablishments in Oceania
Defunct airlines of the United States